Ryrie Rock is an isolated rock off the coast,  northeast of Kidson Island and  northeast of Byrd Head. Discovered in February 1931 by the British Australian New Zealand Antarctic Research Expedition (BANZARE) under Mawson, who named it for the Australian High Commissioner in London at the time.

References

Rock formations of Mac. Robertson Land